Anna Tikhomirova (born 4 December 1984) is a Russian table tennis player. She competed for Russia at the 2012 Summer Olympics.

References

External links
 
 
 

Russian female table tennis players
Table tennis players at the 2012 Summer Olympics
Olympic table tennis players of Russia
1984 births
Living people
European Games competitors for Russia
Table tennis players at the 2015 European Games
21st-century Russian women